At the 1976 Summer Olympics in Montreal, eight events in fencing were contested. Men competed in both individual and team events for each of the three weapon types (épée, foil and sabre). Women competed in foil events.

One of the gold medalists from West Germany team was Thomas Bach, who currently serves as President of the International Olympic Committee.

Medal summary

Men's events

Women's events

Medal table

Participating nations
A total of 281 fencers (211 men and 70 women) from 34 nations competed at the Montreal Games:

References

External links
Official Olympic Report

 
1976
1976 Summer Olympics events
1976 in fencing
International fencing competitions hosted by Canada